Electric Forest is a novel by Tanith Lee published in 1979.

Plot summary
Electric Forest is a novel about a deformed woman who is given a new body as part of a government espionage effort.
The world called Indigo turned upside down for Magdala Cled one morning. From being that world's only genetic misfit, the outcast of an otherwise ideal society, she became the focus of attention for mighty forces. Installed in the midst of the Electric Forest, with its weird trees and its super-luxurious private home, Magdala awoke to the potentials which were opening up about her. And to realize also the peril that now seemed poised above Indigo. Only she, the hated one, could circumvent them.

Reception
Greg Costikyan reviewed Electric Forest in Ares Magazine #1. Costikyan commented that "Electric Forest is more than an excellent novel - it is, in my opinion, one of the best works science fiction has so far produced, something I will reread for the rest of my life [...] The story is gripping, the writing is excellent, the plot twists are dazzling - but even more, Electric Forest turns the reader inside-out, emotionally."

Reviews
Review by Baird Searles (1979) in Isaac Asimov's Science Fiction Magazine, October 1979 
Review by Tom Easton (1980) in Analog Science Fiction/Science Fact, March 1980

References

External links
  

1979 British novels
Doubleday (publisher) books
Novels by Tanith Lee